Pete Eneh (died 15 November 2012) was a Nigerian actor. He was one of the pioneers of the Video era of Nollywood and was said to have acted in over 50 Nollywood movies before his death.

He died due to the pain of living with an amputated leg on 15 November 2012 in Enugu State, Nigeria.

Filmography
Issakaba
Perfect Temptation 2 (2008)
Royal Palace''' (2005)Heavy Rain (2004)Love and likenessOld School'' (2002)

References

External links

Year of birth missing
2012 deaths
21st-century Nigerian male actors
Male actors from Enugu State
Nigerian male film actors
People from Enugu State
Nigerian amputees
Nigerian male television actors
Igbo male actors
Actors from Enugu State